White Snow is a 2020 Russian biographical sports drama film directed by Nikolay Khomeriki.
The film is based on real events that happened at the 1997 FIS Cross-Country World Cup. For the first time in the history of the competition, a man or woman skier Yelena Välbe played by Olga Lerman won five out of five gold medals in all events entered.

It is scheduled to be theatrically released on March 4, 2021 by KaroRental.

Plot 
The film tells about a girl named Lena Trubitsyna from Magadan, Soviet Union, who has become a successful sportswoman and participates in the World Ski Championships.

In 1997, at the World Ski Championships in Trondheim, Norway and for the first time in the history of World Championship skiing, a skier, Russian Yelena Välbe, won five gold medals out of five possible. 

Returning the awards to Russia, Välbe goes on a tour of Norway. There she learns more about the Norwegian monarchy, as she is interested in the history of the royal family. The king learns about Välbe in Norway and invites her to the royal palace. The conversation is about the merits of skiing. The king is of course a ski enthusiast and invites Välbe to coach the Norwegian ski team.
Välbe suddenly remembers the whole past through a flashback that starts from the very beginning and ends with a momentous day in Trondheim.

Cast 
 Olga Lerman as Yelena Välbe (also tr. Elena Vyalbe), a Soviet and Russian cross-country skier
 Angelina Välbe as Yelena 'Lena' Trubitsyna, 8 years old
 Polina Vataga as Yelena 'Lena' Trubitsyna, 14 years old
 Fyodor Dobronravov as Viktor, grandfather 
 Nadezhda Markina as Militsa, grandmother 
 Anna Ukolova as Yelena's mother 
 Aleksandr Ustyugov as Maksimych, instructor
 Mikhail Bespalov as Trubitsyn, a taxi driver
 Darya Ekamasova as Irina Makarova
 Anna Kotova as Larisa Lazutina
 Vadim Andreyev as Petr
 Dmitriy Podnozov as Grushin
 Aleksander Gorbatov as Yuriy 'Yura'
 Polina Chernyshova as Nina Gavrylyuk
 Ekaterina Ageeva as Olga Danilova
 Aleksandr Klyukvin as Zharov, a sports commentator
 Vladimir Kapustin as Voronin
 Natalya Tereshkova as Tamara Tikhonova
 Lasse Lindberg as King of Norway
 Johan Elm as Urmas Välbe (also tr. Urmas Vyalbe)
 Stepan Rival as Franz 
 Artyom Eshkin as Ilya
 Mariya Bystrova as Trude Dybendahl
 Odd Helge Brugrand as Norwegian policeman

Production 

The concept of the film is based on a large-scale biopic set in the winter ski mountains of Russia and Estonia. The filmmakers presented a film about historical and legendary records in cross-country skiing, recorded in the history of sports by the Russian athlete Yelena Välbe. Since February 1997, at Granåsen Ski Centre in Trondheim, Norway, at the FIS Nordic World Ski Championships 1997, one of the most striking events in the history of Russia and the world of sports took place: a woman won gold in all five cross-country skiing competitions. Yelena Välbe was a simple resident of Magadan. 

However, the audience witnessed the preservation of sportsmanship and perseverance as the Russian skier gained recognition from Norway. The skier was the only woman to set such a sports record. The filmmakers have known Välbe since the 90s as a beacon of Russian pride. They bought White Snow for the screens, which, in their opinion, is part of the collective consciousness of Russia as a whole. According to director Nikolay Khomeriki, «I was hooked in this story that through the story of one strong man the story of the whole country is being told...».

From the production of the film company EGO Production - White Snow is a reliable retelling of events, permission for which was given by Yelena Vyalbe herself. Today Yelena Välbe is the president of the All-Russian public organization "Russian Ski Racing Federation", head of the Russian Ski Sports Association, multiple world and Olympic champion. When White Snow was in production, Välbe provided support at all stages of filming, including script adjustments and even advice to actresses who played challenging roles in real-life skiing conditions.

Especially for the filming of the film, Atomic and Fischer made skis of the 1997 design.

Filming 
Principal photography began in 2020, the film was shot in the ski mountains of Magadan, Moscow, Russia and Tallinn, Pärnu, Estonia.

A professional sports team of 26 people took part in the filming of the film in the town of Kirovsk, Murmansk Oblast - members of the Russian national skiing team, winners of the World Cup stages, winners of the World Ski Championships, champions and prize-winners of the Russian Championship, an international judge.

The champion's granddaughter Yelena Välbe at the age of 8 played Angelina Välbe in the children's role.

Release
White Snow was the opening film of the 18th international festival "Window to Europe Film Festival". The event took place in December 2020 in the town of Vyborg. In total, the competition program included eleven full-length feature films.

The film premiered in Russia on March 4, 2021, the Russian distributor is the film company "KaroRental".

References

External links 
 

2020 films
2020s Russian-language films
2020 biographical drama films
2020s sports drama films
Russian biographical drama films
Russian sports drama films
Films about women's sports
Sports films based on actual events
Drama films based on actual events
Biographical films about sportspeople
Films directed by Nikolay Khomeriki
Films shot in Moscow
Films shot in Moscow Oblast
Films shot in Russia
Films shot in Estonia